Glenvar Heights is a census-designated place (CDP) and neighborhood in Miami-Dade County, Florida, United States. The population was 20,786 at the 2020 census, up from 16,898 in 2010. The community is served by the Miami ZIP codes 33143 and 33155.

Geography
It is bordered to the north by Coral Terrace, to the east by South Miami, to the southeast by Pinecrest, to the south by Kendall, to the west by Sunset and Olympia Heights, and to the northwest by Westchester.

Demographics

2020 census

As of the 2020 United States census, there were 20,786 people, 7,273 households, and 4,037 families residing in the CDP.

2000 census
As of the census of 2000, there were 16,243 people, 7,243 households, and 3,947 families residing in the CDP. The racial makeup of the CDP was 87.71% White (37.9% were Non-Hispanic White,) 3.00% African American, 0.19% Native American, 2.91% Asian, 0.06% Pacific Islander, 3.42% from other races, and 2.72% from two or more races. Hispanic or Latino of any race were 55.46% of the population.

There were 7,243 households, out of which 23.1% had children under the age of 18 living with them, 38.9% were married couples living together, 11.6% had a female householder with no husband present, and 45.5% were non-families. 34.9% of all households were made up of individuals, and 9.5% had someone living alone who was 65 years of age or older.  The average household size was 2.24 and the average family size was 2.95.

In the CDP, the population was spread out, with 18.2% under the age of 18, 11.1% from 18 to 24, 33.7% from 25 to 44, 23.2% from 45 to 64, and 13.7% who were 65 years of age or older.  The median age was 37 years. For every 100 females, there were 87.6 males.  For every 100 females age 18 and over, there were 84.8 males.

The median income for a household in the CDP was $40,209, and the median income for a family was $53,279. Males had a median income of $35,867 versus $30,510 for females. The per capita income for the CDP was $27,473.  About 7.7% of families and 12.7% of the population were below the poverty line, including 10.7% of those under age 18 and 11.8% of those age 65 or over.

As of 2000, speakers of Spanish as a first language accounted for 60.96% of residents, while English made up 35.18%, French was at 1.01%, Arabic at 0.60%, and Portuguese consisted of 0.54% of the population.

Transportation
The Miami Metrorail Dadeland North station straddles the border of Glenvar Heights and Kendall CDPs.

The Don Shula Expressway Toll Road makes up the northeastern border of Glenvar Heights. Additionally, the Snapper Creek Expressway runs through Glenvar Heights in the south, intersecting with US Route 1 in the southeast corner of the CDP, and the Palmetto Expressway passes through the center of the neighborhood.

Education
Miami-Dade County Public Schools operates public schools.

South Miami Middle School and South Miami K-8 Center are adjacent to, but not in, Glenvar Heights.

South Miami Senior High School is in Glenvar Heights.

St. Thomas the Apostle School of the Roman Catholic Archdiocese of Miami is in Glenvar Heights.

References

Census-designated places in Miami-Dade County, Florida
Census-designated places in Florida